Jimmy Anderson (born 1932), clan name Ahhajumba, is a Muscogee–American painter, musician and Christian preacher. He attended Haskell Institute and then studied art at Bacone College with painters Fred Beaver, Pablita Velarde, and Dick West. Anderson's paintings in the Oklahoma flatstyle movement were first exhibited in the 1950s.

The Osceola Four 
Anderson formed the Osceola Four, a native singing quartet, while studying at Haskell, joining his brother Richard Anderson, Mitcheal Beaver, and J.B. Dreadfulwater. He toured with the group, singing pop songs and spirituals as an evangelical team. The group performed on Oklahoma television shows like the Sooner Shindig show, and they appeared on a Spike Jones Orchestra album as well.

Preaching career 
After graduating from the University of Oklahoma, Anderson attended seminary school. He later became the preacher at Many Springs Baptist Church in Holdenville, Oklahoma. As the last remaining member of the Osceola Four, Anderson still sings at church in both English and his native Creek language.

References 

20th-century American painters
20th-century indigenous painters of the Americas
Native American painters
Muscogee people
Native American musicians
People from Holdenville, Oklahoma
Bacone College alumni
Haskell Indian Nations University alumni
University of Oklahoma alumni
20th-century Native Americans
1932 births
Living people